is a Japanese scholar of the history of science and the study of comparative civilization. Itō is an honorary professor of University of Tokyo and International Research Center for Japanese Studies, and a professor of Reitaku University, and the Chairman of Japan Seaology Promotion Organization. He is also a former president of the International Society for the Comparative Study of Civilizations.

Itō was born in Tokyo, and obtained his bachelor's degree in literature from Tokyo University in 1953, his master's in 1955, and Ph.D. from University of Wisconsin–Madison in 1964. Itō taught at the University of Tokyo, as Professor, from 1978 to 1989, and in International Research Center for Japanese Studies from 1989 to 1995, and in Reitaku University from 1995.

Bibliography 
Ito, S. The Medieval Latin Translation of the Data of Euclid. Tokyo University Press, 1980 and Birkhauser, 1998.

Honours 
Person of Cultural Merit (2020)

External links 
Prof. Shuntaro Ito (Japanese)

1930 births
Living people
Academic staff of Reitaku University
20th-century Japanese historians
Academic staff of the University of Tokyo
Historians of mathematics
Historians of science
University of Tokyo alumni
Persons of Cultural Merit